Drama Studio may refer to:

 Drama Studio London, a drama school in Ealing
 Drama Studio, University of Sheffield, a studio theatre in Sheffield